Ghost Box is an independent, UK-based electronic music record label, launched in 2004 by graphic designer Julian House and producer Jim Jupp. Its roster includes artists such as Jupp's Belbury Poly, House's The Focus Group, and the Advisory Circle, as well as releases by Broadcast and John Foxx among others.

The label's distinctive aesthetic draws on outdated and esoteric British cultural sources from the postwar period, including early electronic and library music, public information films, educational resources, occult stories, and BBC science-fiction programs. Ghost Box consequently became associated with the 2000s music trend known as hauntology.

Background
Ghost Box was established in London in 2004 by producer Jim Jupp and music industry graphic designer Julian House. The label was formally launched on January 10, 2005, and was originally created as an outlet for their own musical experiments, with the idea that each release’s packaging would display a similar design sensibility and allude to a shared imaginary landscape; a very British parallel world of public information films and TV soundtracks, cosmic horror stories, vintage library music and antique synthesisers, folk song, educational programmes, English psychedelia, occult stories and folklore.

Jupp and House have described the label as existing in an imagined or misremembered past. Influenced by school textbooks and the rigid design grid of Penguin and Pelican paperback books, Ghost Box records and CDs were always intended to look and sound like artefacts from a parallel world, familiar, elegant, but somehow "wrong". It’s a world outside of time where cultural references from a roughly 20-year period (1958-1978) are happening all at once.

Their work has been described as an attempt to evoke "a nostalgia for a future that never came to pass, with a vision of a strange, alternate Britain, constituted from the reorder refuse of the postwar period."

Roster
Ghost Box’s key artists are House's own The Focus Group and Jupp’s Belbury Poly as well as The Advisory Circle, the recording name for the work of producer and longest serving Ghost Box collaborator Cate Brooks. Jupp and Brooks have collaborated together as The Belbury Circle. Ghost Box have also released albums by Pye Corner Audio, Mount Vernon Arts Lab, Hintermass (formed by Brooks with former Broadcast and Seeland member Tim Felton), The Soundcarriers and Roj (also formerly of Broadcast), as well as the comeback album by Plone, who are acknowledged by the label as progenitors of the Ghost Box style. Ghost Box has recently began to expand their roster to showcase artists from other countries, such as ToiToiToi from Berlin, Germany and Beautify Junkyards from Lisbon, Portugal.

There have also been releases by guest artists sometimes in collaborating with members of the regular roster over an ongoing series of Ghost Box singles. First the Study Series (nos. 1-10) and more recently the ongoing Other Voices series. Guests have included include Broadcast, John Foxx, Paul Weller, Moon Wiring Club, Cavern of Anti-Matter, Sean O'Hagan, Steve Moore and The Listening Center.

Reception 
Music journalists Simon Reynolds and Mark Fisher borrowed Jacques Derrida's philosophical term hauntology to describe Ghost Box's uniquely surreal visual and musical output. Boing Boing's Mark Pilkington noted Ghost Box founders "fused pop concrète, soundtrack and library music with sharp design and a swarm of esoteric pop-cultural references to create a parallel reality built upon memories of a very British past."
	 
In reviewing Broadcast and The Focus Group Investigate Witch Cults of the Radio Age, PopMatters called Ghost Box "[o]ne of the most rousing (oc)cult phenomena of the past decade" having "created a career conjuring past futurisms and collectively buried fears to create music that quite literally feels like it’s in a different league, even another dimension, than other modern musicians."

Discography

Albums

Singles & EPs

Download only label sampler album

References

External links
 Official Ghost Box Website

 
Electronic music record labels
Hauntology
British independent record labels